Ampelakia (Greek: Αμπελάκια meaning vineyards) is a village in the municipality of Orestiada in the northern part of the Evros regional unit in Greece. Its population was 470 in 2011. Ampelakia is located about 12 km west of central Orestiada. The nearest larger village is Neochori to its northeast.

Population

History
Its name during the Ottoman period was Kouliaklis. Its population was made up of Bulgarians, Turks and Greeks. After a brief period of Bulgarian rule between 1913 and 1919, it became part of Greece. As a result, its Bulgarian and Turkish population was exchanged with Greek refugees, mainly from today's Turkey.

See also
List of settlements in the Evros regional unit

External links
Ambelakia on GTP Travel Pages

References

Populated places in Evros (regional unit)
Orestiada